Sarah Janet Leggott (born 1970) is a New Zealand literature academic. She is currently a full professor at the Victoria University of Wellington.

Academic career
After a 1999 PhD titled  'Reinscribing the female historical subject : auto/biographical voices of contemporary Spanish women writers'  at the University of Auckland, she moved to the Victoria University of Wellington, rising to full professor. In December 2021, Leggott was appointed Acting Pro Vice-Chancellor for both the Wellington Faculty of Humanities and Social Sciences and the Wellington Faculty of Education. She will hold this role until a new vice-chancellor replaces Grant Guilford, who has retired.

Selected works
 Leggott, Sarah. History and autobiography in contemporary Spanish women's testimonial writings. Vol. 8. Edwin Mellen Press, 2001.
 Leggott, Sarah. "Memory, Postmemory, Trauma: The Spanish Civil War in Recent Novels by Women." (2009).
 Leggott, Sarah. Memory, War, and Dictatorship in Recent Spanish Fiction by Women. Bucknell University Press, 2015.
 Leggott, Sarah. The Workings of Memory: Life-Writing by Women in Early Twentieth-Century Spain. Associated University Presse, 2008.
 Leggott, Sarah. "Re-membering Self and Nation: Memory and Life-Writing in Works by Josefina Aldecoa." Confluencia (2004): 11–20.

References

Living people
1970 births
New Zealand women academics
University of Auckland alumni
Academic staff of the Victoria University of Wellington
New Zealand women writers